Morwitz is a German and Jewish surname. Notable people with the surname include:
 Edward Morwitz (1815–1893), German-American physician, inventor and newspaper publisher
 Ernst Morwitz (1887–1971), German-American poet, literary historian and judge

German-language surnames
Jewish surnames